Colicroot is a common name for several plants and may refer to:

 Aletris spp. - main use
 Apocynum androsaemifolium 
 Asarum canadense
 Asclepias tuberosa 
 Dioscorea villosa, native to eastern North America
 Liatris squarrosa, native to eastern and central North America